Dilophus nigrostigma is a species of Bibionidae endemic to New Zealand. It is the largest and most common species of Dilophus in New Zealand.



Taxonomy
Dilophus nigrostigma was first described as Bibio nigrostigma in 1848. In 1901, Frederick Hutton shifted B. nigrostigma into the Dilophus genus. D. nigrostigma was last revised in 1990.

Description 
Compared to other New Zealand endemic Dilophus, D. nigrostigma is quite large (roughly 7–8mm in length). They can be further distinguished from the other species by the presence of three large spines on the fore tibia. The species is sexually dimorphic, with the males coloured black and the females light brown to reddish in colour.

Distribution and habitat 
The species is restricted to New Zealand. It occurs on the two main islands, Stewart Island and the Chatham Islands.The adults occur from April to July, but are most common from November to February.

Plant associations 
Dilophus nigrostigma frequently visits a variety of plants, presumably to feed on nectar. Reported plant associations are listed below.

References

Bibionidae
Diptera of New Zealand
Endemic fauna of New Zealand
Insects described in 1848
Endemic insects of New Zealand